Douglas Steven Frobel (born June 6, 1959) is a Canadian retired professional baseball player. An outfielder, he appeared in 268 Major League games over five seasons (1982–1985; 1987).

Signed as an amateur free agent in 1977, Frobel was developed in the Pittsburgh Pirates' farm system to take over the starting right fielder position from Dave Parker in 1984, after he batted .304 with 24 home runs and 80 runs batted in for the Triple-A Hawaii Islanders in 1983.

Prone to strikeouts, Frobel never played regularly but had a career high of 12 home runs in 126 games played in 1984.

In 607 MLB plate appearances and 542 at bats, Frobel registered 109 hits and 155 strikeouts.

A park in Nepean, Ontario was named after him.

External links 
, or Retrosheet, or Baseball Reference (Minor and Mexican leagues), or Pura Pelota (Venezuelan Winter League)

1959 births
Living people
Auburn Red Stars players
Baseball people from Ontario
Birmingham Barons players
Buffalo Bisons (minor league) players
Canadian expatriate baseball players in Mexico
Canadian expatriate baseball players in the United States
Charleston Pirates players
Cleveland Indians players
Diablos Rojos del México players
Hawaii Islanders players
Indianapolis Indians players
Jacksonville Expos players
Major League Baseball players from Canada
Major League Baseball right fielders
Mexican League baseball players
Montreal Expos players
Navegantes del Magallanes players
Canadian expatriate baseball players in Venezuela
Pittsburgh Pirates players
Portland Beavers players
Salem Pirates players
Shelby Pirates players
Sportspeople from Ottawa
Tidewater Tides players
Vancouver Canadians players